Tiền Hải is a rural district of Thái Bình province in the Red River Delta region of Vietnam. As of 2003 the district had a population of 213,616. The district covers an area of 226 km². The district capital lies at Tiền Hải.

Notable people
Hoang Van Thai (1915-1986), first Chief of General Staff of Vietnam People's Army.

References

Districts of Thái Bình province